The Ahar Cenotaphs are a group of cenotaphs located in Ahar, Udaipur, Rajasthan, India.  The site contains more than 250 cenotaphs of the Maharanas of Mewar that were built over approximately 350 years.  There are 19 chhatris that commemorate the 19 maharajas who were cremated here. The group of cenotaphs is also known as the Mahasati.

References

External links
 http://www.udaipur.org.uk/excursions/ahar.html
 https://web.archive.org/web/20100824042737/http://www.indiasite.com/rajasthan/udaipur/ahar.html

Monuments and memorials in Rajasthan
Buildings and structures in Udaipur
Tourist attractions in Udaipur
Rajasthani architecture
Cenotaphs in India